GNOME Display Manager (GDM) is a display manager (a graphical login manager) for the windowing systems X11 and Wayland.

The X Window System by default uses the XDM display manager. However, resolving XDM configuration issues typically involves editing a configuration file. GDM allows users to customize or troubleshoot settings without having to resort to a command line. Users can pick their session type on a per-login basis. GDM 2.38.0 is the last version that features customization with themes; subsequent releases do not support themes.

Software architecture
GDM is a display manager that implements all significant features required for managing attached and remote displays. GDM was written from scratch and does not contain any XDM or X Consortium code.

Components
GDM comprises the following components:
 Chooser – a program used to select a remote host for managing a display remotely on the attached display (gdm-host-chooser)
 Greeter – the graphical login window (provided by GNOME Shell)
 Pluggable authentication module (PAM)
 X Display Manager Control Protocol (XDMCP)

Hidden features
Until version 2.22, GDM had a few Easter eggs, in the form of strings to be entered in the username box. These can be found in the source file "gui/guilogin.c", in a function named "evil".

 Dancing login – type "Start Dancing" to start, and "Stop Dancing" to stop.
 (This requires the standard greeter ("GTK+ Greeter"), rather than the graphical one ("Themed Greeter")).
 "Gimme Random Cursor" – can be used repeatedly.
 This changes the mouse cursor to a randomly selected 1 of 77 different "cursor fonts" as defined in the X11 specification.
 "Require Quarter" (or "Require Quater", for backward compatibility with a typo in the original), then log in normally – a dialog box that reads "Please insert 25 cents to log in." appears after entering the password. Clicking "OK" allows the login process to proceed as normal.

Queen of England
Some of the copyright notices of GDM refer to the "Queen of England", whom release announcements from version 2.2.1 also named as a maintainer. Subsequently, developers realised that the title "Queen of England" has not existed since the Acts of Union of 1707.

See also

 getty – a non-graphical login program
 LightDM
 SDDM (KDE Plasma 5)
 KDE Display Manager (KDE Plasma 4)

References

External links

 

GNOME
X display managers